Prem Sisodiya (born 21 September 1998) is a Welsh cricketer. He made his first-class debut for Glamorgan in the 2018 County Championship on 20 June 2018. Prior to his first-class debut, he was part of England's squad for the 2018 Under-19 Cricket World Cup. He made his Twenty20 debut on 26 August 2019, for Glamorgan in the 2019 t20 Blast.

References

External links
 

1998 births
Living people
Cricketers from Cardiff
Welsh cricketers
Glamorgan cricketers
Wales National County cricketers
Cardiff MCCU cricketers
Welsh people of Indian descent